Jeremiah Taama, MBS is a retired Anglican bishop: he  served as Bishop of Taita–Taveta from 1997 to 2011.

Mwaluda was educated at Oak Hill College and the Trinity School for Ministry. Since retiring as a diocesan he has been Director of GAFCON Bishops Training Institute.

References

20th-century Anglican bishops of the Anglican Church of Kenya
21st-century Anglican bishops of the Anglican Church of Kenya
Anglican bishops of Kajiado
Living people
Year of birth missing (living people)